Atractus natans is a species of snake in the family Colubridae. The species can be found in Brazil. and Peru

References 

Atractus
Reptiles of Brazil
Reptiles of Peru
Snakes of South America
Reptiles described in 2003